Several ships of the French Navy have borne the name Gaulois ("Gaul"):

Ships named Gaulois 
 , a  launched as Trajan in 1792 and renamed 1797
 , 74-gun ship of the line. 
 Gaulois, a Charlemagne-class pre-dreadnought battleship

Notes and references

Notes

References

Bibliography 
 
 

French Navy ship names